Salem Township is one of the twenty-two townships of Washington County, Ohio, United States.  The 2000 census found 1,130 people in the township, 1,021 of whom lived in the unincorporated portions of the township.

Geography
Located in the northern part of the county, it borders the following townships:
Jefferson Township, Noble County - north
Elk Township, Noble County - northeast corner
Liberty Township - east
Lawrence Township - southeast corner
Fearing Township - south
Muskingum Township - southwest
Adams Township - west
Jackson Township, Noble County - northwest corner
Aurelius Township - northwest, east of Jackson Township

The village of Lower Salem is located in central Lower Salem Township, and the unincorporated community of Whipple lies in the township's south.

Name and history
It is one of fourteen Salem Townships statewide.

In 1833, Salem Township contained a meeting house, store, and a steam saw mill.

Government
The township is governed by a three-member board of trustees, who are elected in November of odd-numbered years to a four-year term beginning on the following January 1. Two are elected in the year after the presidential election and one is elected in the year before it. There is also an elected township fiscal officer, who serves a four-year term beginning on April 1 of the year after the election, which is held in November of the year before the presidential election. Vacancies in the fiscal officership or on the board of trustees are filled by the remaining trustees.

References

External links
County website

Townships in Washington County, Ohio
Townships in Ohio